Allan Robert Wallbank (born 1937) was a New Zealand politician of the Labour Party.

Biography

Early life and career
Wallbank was born in Ngāruawāhia in 1937. In his youth he was a provincial representative rugby player.

He worked at the Public Trust Office for three years until he entered farming in the King Country. He owned a dairy and pig farm for seven years and later a meat and wool farm for fourteen years. He was a branch chairman and district vice-president of the Young Farmers' Club. For two years he was a Aerial topdressing representative. He was a prominent member of Federated Farmers, being a branch chairman, member of the Auckland area executive and national vice-president. By 1984 his farm was 1,400 acres in size and was running a thoroughbred unit. He was a member of the New Zealand Asthma Foundation and president of the Gisborne Asthma Society.

Political career

He was elected to Labour's national executive and a member of the party's policy council. In 1981 he was first on election night, but lost on a recount.

He developed Guillain–Barré syndrome which damaged his nerves and was confined to a wheelchair for his recovery. While still needing a wheelchair he travelled to Wellington to attend a special caucus meeting in 1988 to support Prime Minister David Lange in a leadership challenge by sacked finance minister Roger Douglas. He was defeated by Wayne Kimber; one of a number of losses contributing to the fall of the Fourth Labour Government.

At the 1992 local-body elections he stood as a candidate for Mayor of Gisborne, but was unsuccessful, losing to the incumbent John Clarke.

Personal life
Wallbank is married with four children. His interests are rugby, soccer and polocrosse.

Notes

References

1937 births
Living people
New Zealand farmers
New Zealand Labour Party MPs
People from Gisborne, New Zealand
Unsuccessful candidates in the 1990 New Zealand general election
Unsuccessful candidates in the 1981 New Zealand general election
Unsuccessful candidates in the 1978 New Zealand general election
Members of the New Zealand House of Representatives
New Zealand MPs for North Island electorates
People from Ngāruawāhia